Aaron Lewicki (born July 30, 1987) is an American professional ice hockey player who is currently a Free Agent. He most recently played for the Idaho Steelheads in the ECHL.

Awards and honors
NCAA (CCHA) Terry Flanagan Memorial Award (2009–10)
CHL Rookie of the Year (2010–11)

Career statistics

References

External links

1987 births
American men's ice hockey right wingers
Abbotsford Heat players
Ferris State Bulldogs men's ice hockey players
Houston Aeros (1994–2013) players
Idaho Steelheads (ECHL) players
Living people
Reading Royals players
Rio Grande Valley Killer Bees players
Ice hockey players from Michigan
Toledo Walleye players